Al-Hudaydah, also transliterated as Hodeda, Hodeida, Hudaida or Hodeidah, is the fourth-largest city in Yemen and its principal port on the Red Sea.

As of 2004, its population was 402,560 and it is the centre of the Al Hudaydah Governorate.

History
In the Islamic chronicles, the name Al-Hudaydah was first mentioned in the year 1454/55 and the city became a popular and important one in the 1520s when the Ottomans took over Yemeni Tihāmah.

In 1830s, Al Hudaydah was controlled by Ibrahim Pasha's troops, which turned over its administration to sherif Husayn ibn Ali Haydar. In 1849, it became part of the Yemen Eyalet.

The Malay writer Abdullah bin Abdul Kadir visited Al Hudaydah on his pilgrimage to Mecca in 1854, and describes the city in his account of the journey, mentioning that the custom of chewing khat was prevalent in the city at this time.

In 1914, during the First World War, German troops led by Major Freiherr Othmar von Stotzingen established "Stotzingen-Mission", a wireless station, at Al Hudaydah, which was used during the Arab Revolt to relay communications from Constantinople (now Istanbul) to German East Africa as well as broadcast propaganda to the Anglo-Egyptian Sudan, British Somaliland and Abyssinia.

The city was briefly occupied by Saudi forces during the Saudi–Yemeni War of 1934.

After a disastrous fire in January 1961 destroyed much of Al-Hudaydah, it was rebuilt, particularly the port facilities, with Soviet aid. A highway to Sana'a, the capital, was completed in 1961. The city was also the site of a Soviet naval base in the 1970s and 1980s.

Al-Hudaydah has a large number of historical places. The city is not large but it has more than one hundred old mosques. Furthermore, it used to have a university, that was as old as al-Azhar.

Economy
Situated on the Red Sea, it is an important port, exporting coffee, cotton, dates and hides. It was developed as a seaport in the mid-19th century by the Ottoman Turks. As of June 2018, three quarters of humanitarian and commercial cargo entering Yemen arrived via the port of Hudaydah. It serves as the entry point for Yemen's humanitarian aid and around 70% of commercial imports.  The port of Ras Isa is slightly north of Al Hudaydah proper, and is the terminus of the Marib–Ras Isa oil pipeline from inland Yemen, with a major storage and offloading vessel named FSO Safer moored offshore, though idled since the beginning of the Yemeni Civil War in 2015.

In 1920, the British described Al Hudaydah's port as being a "poor harbour." With two entrances, it was only able to provide adequate storage and shelter for small boats, with larger boats and ships having to dock over two miles away. In 1908, a new pier was built, which had trouble with depth, leading most imported items to be dumped on the beach instead of delivered by dock. Coal was often available for visiting vessels. A new harbour was built 10 miles northwest of the town by the Ottoman government, with a small train line leading to Al Hudaydah, and connected to the Sana-Hodeida Railway. A French company built the rail system, which was halted upon the Italo-Turkish War breakout. In 1909, the port was bringing in less than the port at Jeddah. That year, 172 steam ships visited the port. The majority of the goods were from the United Kingdom, followed by Italy, Russia and Germany. German imports had grown from 1905 to 1909, with British shipping declining. Despite struggles with a good quality harbour, the town was described as being the centre of dhow building.

The city was known for producing striped coarse cotton cloth, woven by hand. The artisans making the cloth were relocated to Al Hudaydah from Zabīd and Beit el-Faki due to tribal conflict. The city was also a centre for tanning and sandal making.

In the late 19th-century, Al Hudaydah was a chief exporter of coffee, with that export business shifting to Aden in the early 20th-century due to more secure routes at Aden. Al Hudaydah had to transport their goods usually through Yemen and Indian ports for security reasons, making exportation to the United Kingdom troublesome. During this time period, the region imported cereal and rice from India, cotton from Manchester, England and the United States, iron and steel from Germany, and general goods from Italy and Austria. As of 1920, the city was exporting fuller's earth, hides and coffee. The coffee produced in Al Hudaydah was considered some of the finest in the region.

Yemeni Civil War

The port of Al Hudaydah plays a crucial role in allowing food to be imported into the country. This role has been disrupted several times over the course of the Yemeni civil war.

In June 2018, pro-Hadi government forces with the backing of the United Arab Emirates and Saudi Arabia entered the port of Al Hudaydah, in an effort to dislodge Houthi forces. Due to the risk of a humanitarian crisis if the port is besieged, the United Nations attempted to secure an agreement with the Houthis to place the port under UN control, but was unsuccessful until December 13, 2018, on which date, there was an announcement by the UN general secretary António Guterres that the two sides to the civil war have reached an agreement on a ceasefire.

Climate
Al Hudaydah has a hot desert climate (Köppen climate classification: BWh).

See also 
Hodeida International Airport
Hudaydah Port

References

External Links
Photos of al-Hudaydah at the American Center of Research

Populated places in Al Hudaydah Governorate
Port cities in the Arabian Peninsula
Port cities and towns of the Red Sea